County State-Aid Highway 81, also known as County Road 81, (County 81) is a county highway in Hennepin County, Minnesota, which runs from its interchange with Interstate 94 (I-94), CR 66, and CR 152 (Washington Avenue North) in the city of Minneapolis, and continues northwest to its terminus at Main Street (State Highway 101, MN 101) in suburban Rogers.

Route description

County Road 81 (CR 81) begins at the intersection with Washington Avenue (CR 152/CR 66), in Minneapolis. It goes northwest into the city of Robbinsdale, intersecting with CR 9 (42nd Avenue) and has an interchange MN 100. It enters Crystal shortly after the interchange, intersecting with CR 10 (Bass Lake Road) and several smaller roads. It enters Brooklyn Park, south of its intersection with 63rd Avenue. In the city, the route has an interchange with I-94 / I-694. Afterwards, it intersects with several county roads: CR 152 and CR 130 (Brooklyn Boulevard,) and CR 109. It also has a new interchange with US Highway 169 (US 169). In Osseo, it intersects with Jefferson Highway / Central Avenue. In Maple Grove it intersects with Zachary Lane North, CR 30 (93rd Avenue), CR 130 (Elm Creek Boulevard), MN 610, Fernbrook Lane and Maple Grove Parkway. In Dayton, it intersects with CR 101 / CR 13. In Rogers it intersects with CR 150 and becomes MN 101 at I-94.

History
CR 81, between the Robbinsdale and Minneapolis border and present-day US 169 in Brooklyn Park, was constructed between the late 1940s and 1950s. Until I-94 and I-494 were built, CR 81 served as the principal route between Minneapolis and points northwest.

Formerly a trunk highway supervised by the state and known as US 52, US 169, MN 101, MN 152, and MN 218 in various segments at various times, the state turned over management of the roadway to Hennepin County in 1988 and it was renumbered to CR 81. From 1982 to 1988, a portion of the route was known as MN 81.

The portion of CR 81 from Rogers to Robbinsdale was recently signed as Bottineau Boulevard, named after historic frontiersman Pierre Bottineau. The portion of CR 81 in North Minneapolis is still signed as West Broadway.

In 2004, the at-grade intersection with MN 100 was converted into an interchange along with other intersections on MN 100 during a reconstruction project. In 2008, a reconstruction project in Robbinsdale (Lowry Avenue to MN 100) was completed. Also, in Maple Grove, a reconstruction project near Fernbrook Lane, Elm Creek Boulevard, and Maple Grove Parkway was completed, reconstructing the Fernbrook Lane intersection and adding new intersections at Elm Creek Boulevard and Maple Grove Parkway, when Elm Creek Boulevard was extended and Maple Grove Parkway was paved to its reconstructed interchange with I-94.

In 2011, the intersection with US 169 was converted into an interchange, along with the road's reconstruction from the former intersection with US 169 to CR 109 (85th Avenue), the extension of the nearby 83rd Avenue North and construction on local streets. Also in 2011, when MN 610 was extended, a half of a new interchange was built south of CR 130 (Elm Creek Boulevard) near the end of the new portion of MN 610. In Rogers, CR 81's terminus was moved from its former intersection with MN 101/CR 150 to MN 101's interchange with I-94. Also the intersection with MN 101 and CR 150 was demolished, during a different road construction project.

Future

Since 2000, local governments and business leaders in the CR 81 corridor (also known as the Northwest Corridor Partnership) have been working together on a strategic redevelopment plan supported by a transit line.  Rapid bus transit was originally considered for this corridor in the early 2000s. Since 2007, light rail transit is now being studied as the more favorable option.

Reconstruction work
A  segment of CR 81 reconstruction project began in 2010. This section is from 47th Avenue North in the city of Robbinsdale to CR 30 in the city of Maple Grove, resulting ultimately in a six-lane divided urban roadway. The project also passes through the cities of Crystal, Brooklyn Park, and Osseo. The goals of this project are to improve the safety and operations along the roadway, changes will be made to existing access. Major intersections will also be reconstructed. Construction will occur in segments. Construction of Segment One (47th Avenue North in Robbinsdale to CR 10/Bass Lake Road in Crystal) began in 2010, and is expected to be completed in the summer of 2012. Also the construction of Segment Two (CR 81/Bass Lake Road in Crystal to 63rd Avenue North in Brooklyn Park) is partially funded, and expected to begin in 2012. Segments 3 and 4 (63rd Avenue to US 169, US 169 to CR 30/93rd Avenue) are currently not funded.

Major intersections

References

081
Transportation in Minneapolis–Saint Paul
Transportation in Minneapolis
Crystal, Minnesota
Brooklyn Park, Minnesota
Maple Grove, Minnesota
081 1980s
U.S. Route 52
U.S. Route 169